Ann Dandrow (née Platt) (August 20, 1936 – January 25, 2017) was an American educator and politician.

Born in Boston, Massachusetts, Dandrow graduated from St. Mary's High School, in 1954, in New Haven, Connecticut. She then received her bachelor's and master's degrees from New Hampshire College (now Southern New Hampshire University). In 1970, Dandrow moved with her husband and family to Southington, Connecticut. Dandrow was adjunct professor at University of Connecticut and served as assistant director of the Berlin Senior Center. Dandrow served on the Southington Town Board and on the Southington Board of Education. Dandrow served as  a member of the Connecticut House of Representatives from 1986 to 2002. Dandrow was a Republican.

References

1936 births
2017 deaths
Politicians from Boston
People from Southington, Connecticut
Southern New Hampshire University alumni
University of Connecticut faculty
Women state legislators in Connecticut
School board members in Connecticut
Republican Party members of the Connecticut House of Representatives
American women academics
21st-century American women